Distance decay is a geographical term which describes the effect of distance on cultural or spatial interactions.  The distance decay effect states that the interaction between two locales declines as the distance between them increases. Once the distance is outside of the two locales' activity space, their interactions begin to decrease. It is thus an assertion that the mathematics of the inverse square law in physics can be applied to many geographic phenomena, and is one of the ways in which physics principles such as gravity are often applied metaphorically to geographic situations.

Mathematical models

Distance decay is graphically represented by a curving line that swoops concavely downward as distance along the x-axis increases.  Distance decay can be mathematically represented as an inverse-square law by the expression

 
or
,

In practice, it is often parameterized to fit a specific situation, such as:

It can take other forms such as negative exponential, i.e.

.

In addition to fitting the parameters, a cutoff value can be added to a distance decay function to specify a distance beyond which spatial interaction drops to zero, or to delineate a "zone of indifference" in which all interactions have the same strength.

Applications
Distance decay is evident in town/city centres. It can refer to various things which decline with greater distance from the center of the Central Business District (CBD):
 density of pedestrian traffic
 street quality 
 quality of shops (depending on definitions of 'quality' and 'center')
 height of buildings 
 price of land

Distance decay weighs into the decision to migrate, leading many migrants to move less far.

With the advent of faster travel and communications technology, such as telegraphs, telephones, broadcasting, and internet, the effects of distance have been reduced, a trend known as  time-space convergence. Exceptions include places previously connected by now-abandoned railways, for example, have fallen off the beaten path.

Related concepts 
Related terms include "friction of distance", which describes the forces that create the distance decay effect. Waldo R. Tobler's "First law of geography", an informal statement that "All things are related, but near things are more related than far things," and the mathematical principle spatial autocorrelation are similar expressions of distance decay effects.
"Loss of Strength Gradient" holds that the amount of a nation's military power that could be brought to bear in any part of the world depends on geographic distance.

See also 
 Concentric zone model
 Concepts and Techniques in Modern Geography
 Gravity model
 Inverse distance weighting
 Inverse-square law
 The Isolated State
 Trip distribution
 Tobler's first law of geography
 Tobler's second law of geography

References 
 
 Fellman, Getis, and Getis. Human Geography, eighth edition, pp. 68–69.

Geography